Winkler County Airport  is a county-owned, public-use airport in Winkler County, Texas, United States. It is located three nautical miles (6 km) northwest of the central business district of Wink, Texas. This airport is included in the National Plan of Integrated Airport Systems for 2011–2015, which categorized it as a general aviation facility.

History 
The airport was opened in August 1941 as Wink Field and was used by the United States Army Air Forces as a training base.  It was an auxiliary airfield to Hobbs Army Airfield, New Mexico as part of the AAF Advanced Flying School (Twin-Engine) at Hobbs. At the end of the war the airfield was determined to be excess by the military and turned over to the local government for civil use.

Facilities and aircraft 
Winkler County Airport covers an area of 1,000 acres (405 ha) at an elevation of 2,822 feet (860 m) above mean sea level. It has two asphalt paved runways: 13/31 is 5,003 by 100 feet (1,525 x 30 m) and 4/22 is 3,514 by 100 feet (1,071 x 30 m).

For the 12-month period ending August 13, 2009, the airport had 3,400 aircraft operations, an average of 283 per month: 97% general aviation and 3% military. At that time there were 3 aircraft based at this airport, all ultralight.

See also 
 List of airports in Texas
 Texas World War II Army Airfields

References

External links 
 Airport page at Winkler County website
  at Texas DOT Airport Directory
 Aerial image as of January 1996 from USGS The National Map
 

Airports in Texas
Buildings and structures in Winkler County, Texas
Transportation in Winkler County, Texas
Airfields of the United States Army Air Forces in Texas